The 2016 Misano Superbike World Championship round was the eighth round of the 2016 Superbike World Championship. It took place over the weekend of 17–19 June 2016 at the Misano World Circuit Marco Simoncelli.

Championship standings after the round

Superbike Championship standings after Race 1

Superbike Championship standings after Race 2

Supersport Championship standings

Notes

External links
 Superbike Race 1 results
 Superbike Race 2 results
 Supersport Race results

2016 Superbike World Championship season
Misano Superbike World Championship round
Misano Superbike World Championship round